Nur Amirul Fakhruddin Mazuki (born 24 January 1992) is a Malaysian cyclist, who currently rides for UCI Continental team .

Major results

2011
 5th Melaka Governor's Cup
2012
 4th Overall Tour de Ijen
2013
 CFI International Race
1st Mumbai
2nd Delhi
 National Road Championships
2nd Road race
3rd Time trial
 6th Melaka Governor's Cup
2015
 1st  Road race, National Road Championships
 1st  Mountains classification Jelajah Malaysia
 1st  Mountains classification Sharjah Cycling Tour
 5th Overall Tour of Borneo
1st  Points classification
1st Stage 4
 7th UAE Cup
2017
 Jelajah Malaysia
1st  Points classification
1st Stage 1
 5th Road race, Southeast Asian Games
2018
 10th Overall Tour of Fuzhou
 10th Overall Sri Lanka T-Cup
2019
 1st  Road race, National Road Championships
 1st  Overall Tour de Siak
1st  Points classification
1st Stage 1
 1st Stage 3 Tour of Peninsular
 3rd Overall Tour de Hokkaido
 10th Oita Urban Classic
2020
 2nd Road race, National Road Championships

References

External links

1992 births
Living people
Malaysian male cyclists
Cyclists at the 2018 Asian Games
Asian Games competitors for Malaysia
20th-century Malaysian people
21st-century Malaysian people